is an actress, model and accomplished swimmer.

She has a younger sister, Mami Inoue, who is also pursuing a similar career. Also, a younger brother, Eiki Kitamura, with whom she performed alongside in Rock Musical Bleach.  Because of her spontaneity, poise and effortless abilities in front of a camera, there are also various DVDs, books and calendars dedicated to her image to be found in her native Japan. She has released pop singles.  She was the character "Hiromi Ueda" in the 1995 TV series Kimi To Deatte Kara.

Asakusa Kid is based on a semi-autobiographical book of the same name by the avant-garde comedian Takeshi Kitano.

Inoue graduated from Shinjuku Yamabuki High School in Tokyo.

Filmography
  (1991)
 賞・金・犬WANTED！ (1995)
  (1995)
 Moonlight Whispers (1999)
 Freeze Me (2000)
 銀の男　青森純情篇 　プロフェッショナル・マネージメント 　...　平井美和 (2002)
 Graveyard of Honor (2002)
  (2002)
 行動隊長伝　血盟 (2003)
 怪談新耳袋　劇場版 (2004)
 Gonin Saga (2015)

Musical
 テングメン(2006)
 Rock Musical BLEACH The Dark of The Bleeding Moon - Rangiku Matsumoto (August 2006)
 Rock Musical BLEACH The ALL - Rangiku Matsumoto (March 2008)
 Rock Musical BLEACH The Live Bankai Show Code 002 - Rangiku Matsumoto (March 2008)
 Rock Musical BLEACH The Live Bankai Show Code 003 - Rangiku Matsumoto (January–February 2010)

References

External links
Official blog (in Japanese)

JMDb profile (in Japanese)
Harumi Inoue Biography
Harumi Inoue Gallery

Japanese actresses
Japanese gravure models
Japanese female adult models
Japanese television personalities
1974 births
Living people
Musicians from Kumamoto Prefecture